"Just Another Girl" is a song by American recording artist Monica. It was written by Carsten Lindberg, Lindy Robbins, Damon Sharpe, and Joachim Svare with production by Ric Wake from W&R Group and additional contribution by Richard "Richie" Jones and Great Dane Productions. Originally intended for Monica's third studio album All Eyez on Me (2002), it was eventually recorded for the soundtrack of the 2001 motion picture comedy Down to Earth after a different song by producer Kevin "She'kspere" Briggs was rejected as the film's title tack by Sony Music.

An uptempo song, "Just Another Girl" finds the female protagonist expressing her doubt on her man's fidelity. Released to positive reviews by contemporary music critics, who called it "sassy [and] crackling", the song was released as the soundtrack's only single in the United States, where it became a moderate commercial success, peaking at number 64 on the US Billboard Hot 100 and number 34 on the component Hot R&B/Hip-Hop Singles & Tracks chart. An accompanying music video was filmed with director Dave Meyers in January 2001.

Background and recording
"Just Another Girl" was written by Carsten Lindberg, Lindy Robbins, Damon Sharpe, and Joachim Svare, while production was handled by English producer Ric Wake from W&R Group, with additional production by Richard "Richie" Jones and Great Dane Productions. It was recorded by Dave Scheuer at The Dream Factory in New York City, Cove City Sound Studios in Long Island, New York, and Doppler Studios in Atlanta, Georgia. Dan Hetzel mixed with further assistance from Jim Annunziato. Arrangements were handled by Great Dane Productions and Wake, while keyboards and programming was led by Lindberg, Svare, and Jones. Additional keyboard contribution came from Eric Kupper.

Originally crafted for Monica's then untitled third studio album, All Eyez on Me (2002), the song was not expected to be used for the soundtrack of Chris and Paul Weitz's 2001 comedy film Down to Earth, starring comedian Chris Rock. Instead, Monica recorded a different title track with producer Kevin "She'kspere" Briggs that Sony Music decided not to use however, prompting her to enter recording sessions with Ric Wake. During an interview, she said, "Everybody loved the record, but it was being held for my album. So there were some issues about getting the song, and once we did, we actually worked through the Christmas holidays recording it." While Monica remarked, that "Just Another Girl" was not "pertaining to the stage in [her] life [she was] in" as she was waiting and looking different material to be recorded for her album, the record was later included as a bonus track on the All Eyez on Me album.

Reception
Jason Birchmeier of Allmusic described the song as being "successive", while Elysa Gardner from Vibe magazine wrote that "Monica's sassy, crackling 'Just Another Girl' is a winner."

Music video
The music video for "Just Another Girl" was directed by Dave Meyers and filmed inside a Japan setting in California the day after New Year's. Speaking of the shoot, Monica noted in an interview with MTV News that the shoot had its ups and downs, "because coming out of the holidays, people weren't really in work mode". In addition, a water main broke while filming and black smut covered most of the set. Stylistically, the video marked a departure from previous video clips: "I was really excited about being able to look different and come with different imaging, because I think I've grown a lot as a person", the singer stated, "I did moves that were comfortable for me".

The video starts out with features clips from the movie while Monica performs dancing in the background. Monica comes out to make a performance, appears on stage and later so to a downstairs club get together catching a guy's eye. The video ends with a dance scene.

Formats and track listings 

Australian CD single
 "Just Another Girl" (Album Version) 
 "Just Another Girl" (Instrumental) 
 "Just Another Girl" (A Cappella) 
 Jordan Brown – "I Think I Love You"

US CD single
 "Just Another Girl" (Album Version)

US 12" single
A1: "Just Another Girl" (Album Version) 
A2: "Just Another Girl" (Instrumental) 
A3: "Just Another Girl" (A Cappella) 
B1: "Just Another Girl" (Album Version) 
B2: "Just Another Girl" (Instrumental) 
B3: "Just Another Girl" (A Cappella)

Credits and personnel
Credits are taken from Down to Earth liner notes.

 Composer – Carsten Lindberg, Lindy Robbins, Damon Sharpe, Joachim Svare
 Production – Ric Wake
 Additional production – Richard "Richie" Jones, Great Dane Productions
 Arrangement – Great Dane Productions, Ric Wake
 Keyboards, programming – Carsten Lindberg, Joachim Svare, Richard "Richie" Jones

 Additional keysboards – Eric Kupper
 Mix engineering – Dan Hetzel
 Mix assistance engineering – Jim Annunziato
 Recording – "Young" Dave Scheuer
 Production coordination – Marc Russell

Charts

References

External links
 Monica.com — official Monica site
 Monica music videos — watch "Just Another Girl" at LAUNCHcast

2001 singles
Monica (singer) songs
Songs written by Lindy Robbins
Songs written by Damon Sharpe
Song recordings produced by Ric Wake
2000 songs
Sony Music singles
Songs about infidelity